Anthony Moeaki (born June 8, 1987) is a former American football tight end. He played college football at Iowa. He was selected in the third round of the 2010 NFL Draft by the Kansas City Chiefs, and also played for the Buffalo Bills, Seattle Seahawks and Atlanta Falcons.

Early life 
Anthony graduated high school at Wheaton Warrenville South High School in 2005 and was high school football teammates with fellow Iowa Hawkeye Dace Richardson. In addition to football, he was also played basketball and tennis.

College career 
Moeaki played college football at the University of Iowa from 2005 to 2009.

Statistics

Professional career 
Moeaki was projected to be a third or fourth round pick in the 2010 NFL Draft by NFL draft experts and scouts. He was ranked as the seventh tight end prospect in the draft by DraftScout.com and was ranked the eighth best tight end by Bleacher Report.

Kansas City Chiefs
The Kansas City Chiefs selected Moeaki in the third round (93rd overall) of the 2010 NFL Draft.  The Kansas City Chiefs traded their fourth (102nd overall) and fifth round picks (144th overall) in the 2010 NFL Draft to the Houston Texans in order to acquire the third round pick (93rd overall) used to draft Moeaki. Moeaki was the fourth tight end drafted from a class that included Rob Gronkowski, Jermaine Gresham, and Jimmy Graham.

On July 22, 2010, the Kansas City Chiefs signed Moeaki to a four-year, $2.47 million contract.

He scored his first NFL touchdown in his first NFL game on Monday Night Football on September 13, 2010, on a 2-yard pass from quarterback Matt Cassel against the San Diego Chargers. Following the game against the San Francisco 49ers Moeaki received the Pepsi NFL Rookie of the Week award after he put up 44 receiving yards and a spectacular one-handed touchdown grab.

On September 1, 2011, Moeaki was placed on IR after suffering an injury during a preseason game against the Green Bay Packers, which kept him out of the 2011 NFL season. He was reunited with quarterback Ricky Stanzi in 2011 when the Kansas City Chiefs drafted him in the 5th round.

Moeaki shared the starting role with Kevin Boss until Boss went on the IR in Week 2, when he became the primary tight end. He ended up with 33 receptions for 453 yards and a touchdown.

After fracturing his shoulder in the preseason, Moeaki was waived with an injury designation on August 31, 2013. He cleared waivers and was added to the Chiefs' injured reserve list. On October 23, an injury settlement was reached and Moeaki became a free agent.

Buffalo Bills
On December 4, 2013, Moeaki signed with the Buffalo Bills. On August 29, 2014, Moeaki was released during the Bills' final preseason roster cutdowns.

Seattle Seahawks

Moeaki signed with the Seattle Seahawks on November 4, 2014. In his second game with the Seahawks, Moeaki scored a touchdown against his former team, the Chiefs.

Atlanta Falcons
On March 19, 2015, Moeaki signed with the Atlanta Falcons. On September 5, 2015, Moeaki was released by the Falcons. On October 6, 2015, Moeaki was re-signed by the Falcons.

Chicago Bears 
On June 16, 2016, Moeaki signed with the Chicago Bears.
He was cut at the end of training camp on September 3, 2016.

Personal life 
Moeaki is also a member of The Church of Jesus Christ of Latter-Day Saints.

Moeaki's father, Sione Moeaki, won a national championship as a member of Brigham Young University Rugby Team and was a Deans assistant at West Chicago Community High School.

In 2010, Moeaki's sister and former BYU basketball player, Keilani Moeaki, married former Chicago Bears running back Harvey Unga.

References

External links 

Atlanta Falcons bio
Iowa Hawkseyes bio
LeVar Woods Football Academy bio

1987 births
American football tight ends
American Latter Day Saints
American people of Tongan descent
Atlanta Falcons players
Buffalo Bills players
Chicago Bears players
Iowa Hawkeyes football players
Kansas City Chiefs players
Living people
Players of American football from Illinois
Seattle Seahawks players
Sportspeople from Wheaton, Illinois